Coriaria arborea is a highly poisonous and common native shrub or small tree of New Zealand. The common name for this and the other New Zealand species of Coriaria is tutu.

Coriaria arborea is found in scrub and open areas from the coast to the hills across the country. The leaves grow opposite on slender stems while flowers are arranged in drooping racemes. C. arborea is capable of nitrogen fixation.

Ecology 
C. arborea plays host to several species of New Zealand endemic moth including Izatha austera, I. churtoni, I. mesoschista and I. peroneanella.

Uses 
In spite of its toxicity, Tutu was consumed by Māori, specifically the extracted juice from the fleshy flower petals. The gathered berries were placed in specially woven baskets lined with the flower heads of Toetoe, acting as a sieve to separate the poisonous seeds from the squeezed juice. The extracted juice is used as a sweetener to foods such as fernroot or was boiled together with seaweed and left to set as a black jelly called Rehia.

Toxicity 
The toxin tutin is found in all parts of the plant apart from the fleshy flower petals. Tutu has been responsible for the most cases of livestock poisoning by any New Zealand plant. Dogs and even two circus elephants have been poisoned by the plant. On occasion human poisoning has occurred through consuming honey where bees had interacted with the plant.

In 2014, a man tramping in Auckland, New Zealand looking to try the taste of the plant supplejack, mistakenly attempted to eat an asparagus-looking young shoot of tutu. He said he did not actually eat any of the plant because of the revolting taste, but within hours he was having a tonic-clonic seizure that dislocated his arm, induced convulsions and made breathing difficult. Academic experts concluded he was lucky to survive the poisoning. A year later he had recovered fully apart from having some trouble with his memory.

Honey becomes contaminated when bees collect honeydew secreted by the passionvine hopper insect that feeds off the tutu plant. People have occasionally been hospitalised or even killed by honey contaminated with tutin. 1974 was the last case of commercial honey poisoning where 13 people were poisoned. Since 1974 there have been nine other cases of honey poisoning, with the most recent occurring in 1991 in the Bay of Plenty and 2008 in the Coromandel. Periods of drought increase the risk of poisoning.

References

Coriariaceae
Flora of New Zealand